Qeshlaq-e Qirlu (also Romanized as Qeshlāq-e Qīrlū) is a village in Gowg Tappeh Rural District, in the Central District of Bileh Savar County, Ardabil Province, Iran. At the 2006 census, its population was 22, in 8 families.

References 

Populated places in Bileh Savar County
Towns and villages in Bileh Savar County